Solanum villosum, the hairy nightshade, red nightshade or woolly nightshade, is a sprawling annual weed in Europe, western Asia, northern Africa, North America, and is also naturalized in Australia.

Description
An annual herb, to 70 cm, slightly to densely hairy. The leaf blade is ovate, up to 8 cm long, 3–6 cm wide, entire or shallowly lobed, and petioles to 4.5 cm long. Clusters of 3–8–flowers in the inflorescence. The corolla is white. Followed by dull light red or orange-yellow (depending on subspecies) globular berries, 5–9 mm diam. The seeds are 1.7–2.3 mm long and pale yellow.

References

villosum
Flora of Europe
Flora of Africa
Flora of temperate Asia
Taxa named by Philip Miller